Līga Purmale (born 4 October 1948 in Dundaga, Latvian SSR) is a Latvian painter. At a young age she moved to Riga from the Latvian countryside to study painting, first at the Jānis Rozentāls Art High School and then at the Latvian Academy of Art. In the 1970s she and Miervaldis Polis, who was her husband at the time, started a new trend of photorealism in Latvian painting. She currently lives and works in Riga.

References

External links 
 Two Artists Who Broke All the Rules: Liga Purmale and Miervaldis Polis

1948 births
Living people
20th-century Latvian painters
21st-century Latvian painters
20th-century Latvian women artists
21st-century Latvian women artists
People from Dundaga Municipality
Contemporary painters
Latvian women painters